Dousland  is a small settlement in Devon, England. Dousland is within the boundary of Dartmoor National Park.

Dousland had a railway station on the branch line to Princetown that opened in 1883 and closed in 1956. It was operated by the Great Western Railway until nationalisation took place. The station building is now a private dwelling and the platform still survives.

Dousland has a pub.

The “Edwardian Lady” Edith Holden stayed regularly at Dousland between 1902 and 1910. Edith became friendly with the Trathern family who lived in Belbert Cottage. She frequently spent time on Yennadown with Berta and Bella Trathern. Edith noted “ Up on the moor the world seemed to be made of sky and Gorse-such acres of fragrant Golden Blossom under a sky of cloudless blue”.

References

External links

Villages in Devon